RIKEN cDNA 2010107G12 is a protein that in the house mouse is encoded by the 2010107G12Rik gene. The gene is also known as Gm468.

Model organisms				

Model organisms have been used in the study of 2010107G12Rik function. A conditional knockout mouse line, called 2010107G12Riktm1a(KOMP)Wtsi was generated as part of the International Knockout Mouse Consortium program — a high-throughput mutagenesis project to generate and distribute animal models of disease to interested scientists.

Male and female animals underwent a standardized phenotypic screen to determine the effects of deletion. Twenty four tests were carried out on homozygous mutant mice and one significant abnormality was observed: dorsal third ventricle areas were reduced in size.

References

Further reading 
 

Mouse proteins
Genes mutated in mice